The following lists the top 100 albums of 1998  in Australia from the Australian Recording Industry Association (ARIA) End of Year Albums Chart.

Peak chart positions from 1998 are from the ARIA Charts, overall position on the End of Year Chart is calculated by ARIA based on the number of weeks and position that the records reach within the Top 50 albums for each week during 1998.

Notes

References

Australian record charts
1998 in Australian music
1998 record charts